Gilla Áedha Ua Maigín, Bishop of Cork, died 1172.

Sub anno  1172, the Annals of the Four Masters state that:

"Giolla Aedha O'Muidhin (of the family of Errew of Lough Con), Bishop of Cork, died. He was a man full of the grace of God, the tower of the virginity and wisdom of his time."

Lough Conn is located in what is now County Mayo.

External links
 http://www.ucc.ie/celt/published/T100005C/

Medieval Gaels from Ireland
12th-century Roman Catholic bishops in Ireland
Religious leaders from County Mayo
People from County Cork
Bishops of Cork